Epischnia cinerosalis is a species of snout moth in the genus Epischnia. It was described by Francis Walker and Walter Rothschild in 1905. It is found in Sudan.

References

Endemic fauna of Sudan
Moths described in 1905
Phycitini